Dr. Bezbarua is a 1969 Indian Assamese language thriller film, the first film of this genre in the language, directed by Brajen Barua and produced by Rangghar Cine Productions. The film was released on 7 November 1969. It was marked as the beginning of success of so-called commercial movies in Assamese Film industry. It was also first time the outdoor and indoor shooting entirely took place in various locations of Assam.

Casts
 Brajen Barua
 Nipon Goswami
 Pratibha Thakur
 Renu Saikia
 Meghali Devi 
 Biju Phukan
 Tara (actress)
 Tarun Dowrah
 Ranjana Bordoloi
 Satyen Chowdhury

Music
The music of the movie has been composed by Ramen Barua, younger brother of Brajen Barua. Some of the songs of this film are "Moyna Kon Bidhatai", "Ki Naam Di Matim", "Jilika Jilika Tora Akakhore", "Phool Phool Phool" which was sung by Dwipen Barua, Nirmala Mishra etc.

Awards
Dr. Bezbarua was awarded with Silver Medal for Best Feature Film in Assamese in the 17th National Film Awards.

Hindi remake
A Hindi movie titled as Shivam has been remade from this film which was produced by Jogiraj Choudhury and directed by Anshuman Barua, nephew of the film’s original maker Brojen Barua.

Sequel
A sequel Dr. Bezbaruah 2 was released on 3rd February 2023.

References

External links
 
 Shivam - Hindi remake of Dr Bezbaruah Assamese Feature Film Announced
 Hindi film SHIVAM on the lines of super hit Assamese film DR.BEZBARUAH

1969 films
Films set in Assam
Best Assamese Feature Film National Film Award winners
1960s Assamese-language films